The Ullasund Bridge is a bridge that crosses the Ullasundet strait between the islands of Haramsøya and Flemsøya in Ålesund Municipality in Møre og Romsdal county, Norway. The original bridge was opened in 1969. The Ulla lighthouse is located just northwest of the eastern end of the bridge.
 
Many bridges need to be repaired because the salt in the seawater damages the concrete and the iron inside it. The old Ullasund Bridge actually had to be taken down, because it was too damaged. It was taken down in 1998, after just 29 years in service. It has been replaced with a new bridge.

See also
List of bridges in Norway
List of bridges in Norway by length
List of bridges
List of bridges by length

References

External links
A picture of Ullasund Bridge
A picture of the sound between the islands

Bridges in Møre og Romsdal
Bridges completed in 1969
Ålesund